Mig og min lillebror og storsmuglerne is a 1968 Danish comedy film directed by Lau Lauritzen Jr. and starring Dirch Passer.

Cast

 Dirch Passer - Søren
 Poul Reichhardt - Peter
 Karl Stegger - Thorvald
 Guri Richter - Olivia
 Lotte Horne - Lone
 Jesper Langberg - Jens
 Peter Reichhardt - Lille Peter
 Palle Huld - Direktør Holm
 Henrik Wiehe - Hansen
 Else-Marie - Sofie Olsen
 Lise Thomsen - Fru Holm
 Christian Arhoff - Landbetjent Rasmus
 Gunnar Lemvigh - Sognerådsformanden
 Else Petersen - Anna
 Holger Vistisen - Leder af nudistlejeren
 Mogens Brandt - Politimesteren
 Bjørn Puggaard-Müller - Betjent Pedersen
 Jørgen Weel - Betjent
 Jørgen Teytaud - Betjent
 Bjørn Spiro - Arrestforvareren
 Flemming Dyjak - Smugleren Viggo
 Bent Vejlby - Smugleren Hans
 Kirsten Hansen-Møller - Servitricen Hanne
 Lone Lau - Servitricen Pia
 Knud Hilding - Postbudet

External links

1968 films
1968 comedy films
1960s Danish-language films
Films directed by Lau Lauritzen Jr.
Films scored by Sven Gyldmark
ASA Filmudlejning films
Danish comedy films